Gandhidham - Palanpur Passenger is a passenger train belonging to Western Railway zone that runs between  and . It is currently being operated with 59425/59426 train numbers on a daily basis.

Average speed and frequency 

59425/Gandhidham - Palanpur Passenger runs with an average speed of 43 km/h and completes  301 km in 7h. 59426/Palanpur - Gandhidham Passenger runs with an average speed of 42 km/h and completes 301 km in 7h 5m .

Route and halts 

Coach composite

The train has standard ICF rakes with max speed of 110 kmph. The train consists of 12 coaches:

 10 General Unreserved
 2 Seating cum Luggage Rake

Traction

Both trains are hauled by a Vatva Loco Shed based WDM 3A diesel locomotive from Palanpur to Gandhidham and vice versa.

Rake Sharing 

The train shares its rake with 19151/19152 Palanpur - Bhuj Intercity Express.

See also 

 Gandhidham Junction railway station
 Palanpur Junction railway station
 Palanpur - Bhuj Intercity Express

References 

Transport in Bhuj
Rail transport in Gujarat
Slow and fast passenger trains in India
Railway services introduced in 2012